Twynham School (formerly Twynham Comprehensive School) is a coeducational secondary school and sixth form located in Christchurch, Dorset, England and has a school roll of approximately 1,700 students in years 7 to 13 (ages 11 to 18). It has Leading Edge, Training School and Academy Statuses. Twynham is part of the Twynham Learning Multi-Academy Trust, comprising six primary and secondary schools local to Christchurch.

School history 
The school opened in 1930 as a senior school, later becoming a secondary modern school and finally a comprehensive in 1969. The school doubled in size during the 1990s and is one of the largest schools in Dorset. In May 2011 Twynham converted into an academy. It has previously held the Technology College and Music College Statuses.

Facilities
Twynham has 11 science labs. The technology block has two cookery rooms, one textiles room, three resistant material rooms and one graphics room, in addition to an IT room.

In addition, there is an English Block, Maths Block, Drama Block, Music & Arts Block and the main hall, sports hall, changing facilities and the main block with ordinary classrooms.

ICT at Twynham
Twynham has nine computer rooms and offers two courses at GCSE level:
 Computing (Software Development (mainly in Visual Basic))
 European Computer Driving Licence from 2014–present

Twynham also offers a BTEC in Creative Digital Media.

Extra curricular activities 
Extra curricular activities include sports, music and drama.

Notable former pupils 
Jamie Redknapp, pundit and retired footballer
Neil Moss, coach and retired footballer

References

External links
 

Schools in Christchurch, Dorset
Secondary schools in Bournemouth, Christchurch and Poole
Academies in Bournemouth, Christchurch and Poole
Training schools in England
Educational institutions established in 1930
1930 establishments in England